The 1880 North Carolina gubernatorial election was held on November 2, 1880. Incumbent Democrat Thomas Jordan Jarvis defeated Republican nominee Ralph P. Buxton with 51.32% of the vote.

Democratic convention
The Democratic convention was held on June 17, 1880.

Candidates
Thomas Jordan Jarvis, incumbent Governor
Daniel Gould Fowle, former Chairman of the North Carolina Democratic Party
Alfred Moore Scales, U.S. Representative

Results

Republican convention
The Republican convention was held on July 7, 1880.

Candidates
Ralph P. Buxton, Judge of the North Carolina Superior Court
Oliver H. Dockery, former U.S. Representative

Results

General election

Candidates
Thomas Jordan Jarvis, Democratic
Ralph P. Buxton, Republican

Results

References

1880
North Carolina
Gubernatorial